Alonzo Jakeswic Highsmith Jr. (born November 21, 1989) is a former American football outside linebacker. He signed with the Miami Dolphins as an undrafted free agent in 2013. He played college football at Arkansas.

College career

Phoenix College
He attended the junior college Phoenix College.  In 2010, he recorded 94 tackles, 79 of which were solo, and 12 of which were tackles for loss. In addition he achieved four quarterback sacks. During his time at Phoenix College he was selected as the NJCAA Region One co-Defensive Player of the Year and was also named the WSFL Defensive Player of the Year.

Arkansas
Following his sophomore year Highsmith transferred to the University of Arkansas. In his junior season, he started all 13 games for the Razorbacks, recording 80 tackles, 4.5 sacks, one forced fumble, one pass deflection and one interception.

Professional career

Miami Dolphins 
On April 27, 2013, Highsmith signed with the Miami Dolphins as an undrafted free agent following the 2013 NFL Draft. On August 23, 2013, he was waived by the Dolphins.

Kansas City Chiefs
On January 14, 2014, he signed with the Kansas City Chiefs to a reserve/future contract. On August 29, 2014, he was released by the Chiefs.

Washington Redskins
Highsmith Jr. signed with the Washington Redskins on May 18, 2015. He was waived on August 31.

Coaching career
In 2017, he became a football coach at Willcox High School.

Personal life
He is the son of former NFL running back Alonzo Highsmith. His brother is A.J. Highsmith, who currently is a safety for the Miami Hurricanes.

References

External links 
 Miami Dolphins bio
 Kansas City Chiefs bio

1989 births
Living people
Arkansas Razorbacks football players
Hudson Valley Fort players
Miami Dolphins players
Omaha Mammoths players
Washington Redskins players
High school football coaches in Arizona
Phoenix Bears football players
People from Brooksville, Florida
People from Missouri City, Texas
Players of American football from Texas
Sportspeople from Harris County, Texas